The Vanishing is a 1993 American psychological thriller film directed by George Sluizer and starring Jeff Bridges, Kiefer Sutherland, Nancy Travis, and Sandra Bullock. It is a remake of Sluizer's 1988 French-Dutch film of the same name.

Plot

The film begins with chemistry professor Barney Cousins at his cabin, seemingly perfecting methods in which to conduct a successful kidnapping. He is so dedicated to his work that his wife Helene and his daughter Denise suspect he is having an affair.

Jeff Harriman goes on vacation with his girlfriend Diane Shaver, who vanishes without a trace at a gas station. Three years later, Jeff has become obsessed with finding out what happened, posting fliers and following leads relentlessly. Exhausted, he stops at a diner and meets a waitress named Rita who sympathizes with his plight and looks after him. A year later, the two are a couple and have settled in an apartment in Seattle. Jeff, who is attempting to write a novel, meets with a publisher who suggest that he write a book about the disappearance. Knowing this will upset Rita, he hides his project, buys a used military uniform at a surplus store and uses army reserve drills as a cover to continue his search. One weekend, Rita accesses Jeff's computerized rough draft of a book. After reading it, she discovers it's actually about Diane's disappearance. Rita tracks Jeff to his motel room and angrily confronts him. Jeff finally tells the truth about how Diane disappeared. Following Rita's ultimatum, Jeff abandons his search for Diane.

Some months later, Barney is on campus and discovers Diane's missing posters covered with other fliers. He surmises that Jeff has given up his quest for the truth. He decides to bait Jeff by sending him a letter to meet him at a country club to learn the truth about Diane, which Jeff does. While Barney secretly watches, Rita confronts Jeff again and tells him they are done. Rita records an outgoing answering machine message at their home, indicating that she has broken up with Jeff. When Jeff returns, he changes the message without Rita knowing. Barney arrives at Jeff's door and admits that he was responsible for Diane's disappearance. Jeff attacks him and demands answers. Barney promises to show Jeff what happened to Diane, but only if he agrees to go through exactly the same thing she did. Barney explains about his past: he broke his arm after jumping off a roof when he was little, and when he became a husband and father years later, he saved a girl from drowning. He states that this experience led him to an epiphany: With capability of great good also, could there come capability of great evil? The kidnapping of Diane was an attempt to answer that hypothesis.

In a short series of flashbacks, the build-up to the crime is shown: when Diane was in the gas station purchasing drinks for herself and Jeff, she asks Barney for a favor.  She then compliments a bracelet that Barney is wearing, which was given to him by his daughter.  Barney lies to Diane and claims to sell them, and then invites her to his car so she can buy one herself. In his car, Barney uses chloroform to subdue and kidnap her. Then Jeff is taken to the gas station where Diane went missing, and is told that if he drinks a cup of coffee which has been drugged, he will discover her fate by experiencing it. He does, and wakes up to find he has been buried alive in a coffin.

Rita calls home and listens to the changed outgoing message on the answering machine, which had incidentally recorded Barney's voice when he first confronted Jeff. Realizing that Jeff is in danger, she talks with the next door neighbor who witnessed the attack. She learns of Barney's identity and goes to his home and meets his daughter Denise. Not knowing the circumstances and on her way to meet a boy, Denise rides with Rita and gives her directions to her father's cabin. When Rita arrives, a violent fight ensues with Barney eventually gaining the upper hand. Barney offers Rita the same deal that he offers Jeff, but Rita outsmarts him. She lies to Barney and tells him that she has kidnapped Denise. She gets Barney to drink drugged coffee, but does not realize the drug takes 15 minutes to take effect. She goes in search of Jeff and finds a fresh mound of dirt. Believing that he has been buried alive, she digs him out, but is thwarted at the last minute by Barney. Jeff climbs out of the grave, kills Barney with the shovel, and embraces Rita. He sees another grave and finally accepts Diane's death. Jeff and Rita reunite as a couple and sell the story as a novel to a publishing company.

Cast
 Jeff Bridges as Barney Cousins
 Kiefer Sutherland as Jeff Harriman
 Nancy Travis as Rita Baker
 Sandra Bullock as Diane Shaver
 Park Overall as Lynn
 Maggie Linderman (not to be confused with singer Maggie Lindemann) as Denise Cousins
 Lisa Eichhorn as Helene Cousins
 George Hearn as Arthur Bernard
 Lynn Hamilton as Miss Carmichael

Production
Principal photography began on April 6, 1992. Filming took place in and around Washington State, including Seattle, Washington, where most of the film takes place. Locations in town includes the Seattle Yacht Club, the Pioneer Square Station, the Sur La Table at the Pike Place Market & the Aloha Street Apartments. The cabin by the lake at the beginning and for the final climax sequences at the end were filmed at Camp Omache near Monroe, Washington. The setting for the gas station where Diane goes missing, where Jeff waits by the car and where Jeff and Barney talk about Diane's fate was filmed at the Mountainside Shell Station at North Bend, Washington. The scene where Barney takes his family to the falls was filmed at Snoqualmie Falls at Snoqualmie, Washington. The second unit then went to Mount St. Helens to film the areas where Jeff and Diane go on their road trip. When filming was completed in Washington, the crew traveled to Cody, Wyoming, to film the sequence of Jeff's car breaking down in the tunnel. They filmed it at the Cody Tunnel. Finally, they went to Los Angeles, California, to film the scene where Rita is at the pool hall and where Jeff first meets Rita at the restaurant. Filming wrapped on June 21, 1992.

Release
The Vanishing was released in theatres on February 5, 1993, in 1,656 theatres. For its opening weekend, it landed at #4 at the box office grossing $5.0 million. It grossed $6.2 million in its first week. For the second weekend, it dropped to #7 grossing $3.5 million. Finally in its third weekend, it dropped out of the top-ten charts to #14, grossing $1.4 million. After three weeks in theatres, the film eventually made $12.3 million, giving a total of $14.5 million. It was considered to be a box office bomb, and failed to earn back its $20 million budget.

Reception
This remake was poorly received and universally seen as inferior to the original, with particular criticism for its new happy ending. Variety called it "schematic and unconvincing", and Time Outs Nigel Floyd called it "a misjudged, lobotomized Hollywood remake." Mark Kermode summarized: "the original was about the banality of evil, but the remake became about the evil of banality. It was a mess." The Washington Post called it "a case study in how Hollywood can make a complete mess out of what was previously a marvelous film."  Roger Ebert wrote "the movie methodically rewrote all that was good in the earlier version, turning its cold logic into trashy commercialism. The first movie was existential in its merciless unfolding. This one turns into a slasher movie with a cheap joke at the end.  Desson Howe called the film "an inept, quasi-formulaic rehash of everything."

Salon named the film as the worst remake of all time.

On Rotten Tomatoes the film holds a 49% rating based on 37 reviews, with an average rating of 5.20/10. On Metacritic, the film has a weighted average score of 49 out of 100 based on 17 critics, indicating "mixed or average reviews".

See also
 The Vanishing (1988 film)
 Ted Bundy – a serial killer wearing an arm sling, driving a European car

References

External links
 

1993 films
American psychological thriller films
American remakes of Dutch films
American remakes of French films
Films about kidnapping
Films about missing people
Films shot in Wyoming
Films shot in California
Films shot in Los Angeles
Films shot in Washington (state)
Films shot in Seattle
Films set in Washington (state)
Films set in Seattle
1990s psychological thriller films
20th Century Fox films
Films directed by George Sluizer
Films scored by Jerry Goldsmith
1990s English-language films
1990s American films